This is a list of transfers for the 2022 Canadian Premier League season.

This list includes all transfers involving Canadian Premier League clubs after their last match of the 2021 Canadian Premier League season and before their last match of the 2022 season.

Transfers 
Clubs without flags are Canadian.

References

2022
Transfers
Canadian Premier League